Cnodontes vansomereni, the Van Someren's buff, is a butterfly in the family Lycaenidae. It is found in south-western Kenya, Tanzania, Malawi, Zambia (from Lusaka northwards), the Democratic Republic of the Congo (Lualaba and Haut-Shaba) and Angola. The habitat consists of deciduous woodland, thorn-bush and Brachystegia woodland.

References

Butterflies described in 1953
Poritiinae